Ihaka Whaanga (died 14 December 1875) was a notable New Zealand rangatira, assessor and military leader of northern Hawke's Bay. Of Māori descent, he identified with the Ngati Rakaipaaka iwi, connected to Ngāti Kahungunu. Hirini Whaanga Christy was a great grandson. Whaanga died at Māhia on 14 December 1875.

References

External links 

 Portralt of Ihaaka Whaanga, by Gottfried Lindauer

1875 deaths
Ngati Rakaipaaka people
New Zealand military personnel
Year of birth missing
People from the Hawke's Bay Region